The Copper Basin Railway  is an Arizona short-line railroad that operates from a connection with the Union Pacific Railroad (UP) at Magma to Winkelman, in  of length. The railroad also has a  branch line that runs from Ray Junction to Ray, Arizona. There was formerly an interchange with the San Manuel Arizona Railroad (SMA) at Hayden. The CBRY exists primarily to serve a copper mine. L. S. “Jake” Jacobson was the President and Chief Operating Officer, retiring in 2020 after more than 30 years in his position.  In summer 2006, ASARCO Copper Corporation purchased the entire railroad.

Traffic
107,000 cars per year (1996 estimate)
 copper concentrates
 ore
 finished and unfinished copper
 sulfuric acid
 lumber
 military equipment
 gypsum

History

Magma–Winkelman line

The Magma–Winkelman line was constructed by the Atchison, Topeka and Santa Fe Railway (ATSF) subsidiary Phoenix and Eastern Railroad between 1902–1904. The Phoenix and Eastern Railroad built the railroad from Phoenix –Winkelman via Florence. It originally proposed to build to a connection with the Southern Pacific Railroad (SP) at Benson but the line was never built past Winkelman.

The railroad was leased to Santa Fe upon completion of construction on December 10, 1904, and was operated by ATSF subsidiary Santa Fe, Prescott and Phoenix Railway. On March 13, 1907, the Phoenix & Eastern became an operating subsidiary of SP. On March 10, 1910, the Phoenix & Eastern was leased and became a non-operating subsidiary of SP and operated by the Arizona Eastern Railroad. The railroad was sold to the Arizona Eastern Railroad on October 31, 1945. The Arizona Eastern Railroad was merged into SP on September 30, 1955.

The track at Winkelman was extended  to Christmas, Arizona, in 1911 by the Arizona Eastern Railway. That section of track was abandoned by the SP in 1961.

At some point SP sold the line to mine operator Kennecott Copper. On August 15, 1986, the line was sold by Kennecott Copper and the CBRY was started. The CBRY was owned by Rail Management Corporation from 1986–2005. In summer 2006, ASARCO Copper Corporation purchased the entire railroad. ASARCO also owns the Ray Mine and Hayden Smelter, CBRY's primary customers.

This railway served as the backdrop to Dwight Yoakam’s “A Thousand Miles from Nowhere” music video. He is seen near the tracks and moving about a train throughout the video.

Route

The route primarily follows the Gila River.
 Magma (Webster) – UP/MAA
 Florence Junction
 Florence
 Stanco
 Barr
 Munn (Alta)
 Price
 Cochran
 North across the Gila River can be seen the Coke Ovens, several "beehive" kilns. Made from rock, they were originally built to make coke out of local timber and copper/silver ore.
 Butte
 Zellweger
 Wooley
 Ray Junction
 Tunnel 2
 Riverside
 Erman
 Tunnel 3
 Kearny
 Branaman
 Burns
 Hayden Junction. Location of the operational center for the SP until the system was rebuilt to have ore trains go directly from Ray to Hayden for unloading onto a new conveyor system.
 Hayden (office)
 Spur to Kennecott Copper (KCCX) Mill and Smelter
 KCCX Ore Unload
 San Manuel Arizona Railroad Junction (to San Manuel and Mammoth Mine)
 Winkelman

References

Further reading

External links  

Arizona railroads
Railway companies established in 1986
Asarco
1986 establishments in Arizona